Agelenopsis kastoni is a species of funnel weaver in the spider family Agelenidae. It is found in the United States.

References

Agelenidae
Articles created by Qbugbot
Spiders described in 1941